Warm Dust were a British progressive jazz rock band of the early 1970s.  Although a relatively obscure group, they featured Paul Carrack and Terry "Tex" Comer, who later formed Ace.

Members
Les Walker - lead vocals, harmonica, percussion, guitar
Paul Carrack - organ, piano, electric piano, guitar, timpani, percussion, backing vocals
Terry "Tex" Comer - bass, percussion, guitar, recorder
Alan Solomon - saxophone, flute, oboe, piano, synthesizer
John Surguy - saxophone, flute, oboe, vibraphone, clarinet, guitar, backing vocals
Dave Pepper - drums, percussion (on  And It Came To Pass)
Keith Bailey - drums, congas, maracas, backing vocals (on Peace For Our Time)
John Bedson - drums, percussion (on Third Album)

Discography

Albums
 And It Came to Pass (Trend, 1970) 
 Peace for Our Time (Trend, 1971)
 Warm Dust (also called Third Album) (BASF, 1972) 
 Dreams of Impossibilities (BASF, 1972)

Single
 "It's a Beautiful Day"/"Worm Dance" (Trend,1970)

References

External links
http://www.alexgitlin.com/npp/warmdust.htm Discography
http://myweb.tiscali.co.uk/leswalker/ Les Walker

British jazz-rock groups
Musical groups established in 1970
English progressive rock groups
Musical groups disestablished in 1972